Juan Vásquez, in USA Juan Vasquez, may refer to:

Juan Vásquez (composer) (c. 1500–c.1560), Spanish priest and composer of the renaissance
Juan David Ochoa Vásquez (c. 1949–2013), Colombian drug dealer
Juan Materno Vásquez de León (1927–1999), Panamanian lawyer
Juan Carlos Vasquez (born 1986), Colombian composer and sound artist
Juan Esteban Aristizábal Vásquez (born 1972), Colombian rock musician; his legal name is correctly shortened as Juan Aristizábal
Juan F. Vasquez (born 1948), Judge of the United States Tax Court

See also
Juan Vazquez (disambiguation)